The 1984–85 season was Atlético Madrid's 44th season since foundation in 1903 and the club's 38th season in La Liga, the top league of Spanish football. Atlético competed in La Liga, the Copa del Rey, and the UEFA Cup.

Season
Atlético Madrid won the Copa del Rey for the second consecutive season, defeating Parla, Málaga, Deportivo de La Coruña, Spórting de Gijón, and Real Zaragoza on their path to the final against Athletic Bilbao.

Squad

Transfers

In

Out

Results

La Liga

Position by round

League table

Matches

UEFA Cup

Copa del Rey

First round

Second round

Eightfinals

Quarterfinals

Semifinals

Final

Copa de la Liga

Eightfinals

Quarterfinals

Semifinals

Final

Squad statistics

Appearances and goals

References

External links
 Official website

Atlético Madrid seasons
Atlético Madrid